Battlesden is a hamlet and civil parish in the Central Bedfordshire district of  Bedfordshire, England.   It is just north of the A5, between Dunstable and Milton Keynes.  According to the 2001 census, it had a population of 38.  Because of its low electorate, it has a parish meeting rather than a parish council.  It is in the civil parish of Milton Bryan.

Battlesden House was a large manor house situated in parkland, Battlesden Park, close to the hamlet.

Former residents of the village include Henry Skynner & John Dunnyng, both husbandman, defending a case of trespass in Badelesden, in 1422. John Smyth, the complainant, had land in Badelesden, and stated that 100 shillings worth of damage was done to his land.

Battlesden Church

The church at Battlesden is believed to be haunted by a lay friar.

The history of the county of Bedford mentions the church.

The church of ST. PETER AND ALL SAINTS is a small aisleless building set on the south slope of a hill, its earliest part dating apparently from the last quarter of the 13th century. There is a two-light window of this date in the south wall of the nave near the west end, and opposite to it in the north wall a single lancet, their late date being shown by the existence of original glass grooves. The nave is 41 ft. by 21 ft., and in its south-west corner a tower has been built in the 15th century, evidently on insufficient foundations, as it has gone over south-westwards, and is much buttressed and patched in consequence. The chancel is probably of early 14th-century date, though nothing but the chancel arch now remains to show detail of that time; its east window is modern, and its two south windows much restored 16th-century two-light openings. Between them is a plain doorway, and there is a square recess with no sign of a drain below the south-east window. On either side of the east window are 15th-century image brackets carried by angels, whose very modern heads do not agree well with their mediaeval bodies, and in the north wall is a square plastered recess. The chancel arch has good moulded capitals and stops to its chamfered arch, but of the moulded base only a small piece remains.
The nave had a rood-stair at the south-east, of which only the lower doorway remains, and next to it a wide two-light 15th-century window. In the north wall is a 17th-century window of three lights with a transom, and west of it a two-light 15th-century window, and there is a squint to the chancel in the north jamb of the chancel arch. The north doorway of the nave is plain 14th-century work under a small and late porch, and west of it is the lancet already mentioned. There is no trace of a south door to the nave, but high in the wall about midway on this side is a plain and late two-light window, intended to serve a gallery east of the tower, now removed. The low-pitched nave roof has late 15th-century moulded tie-beams, purlins, &c., and the chancel roof is modern.
The tower has simple chamfered arches to the nave on the east and north, and in its west wall is a doorway now blocked by a red brick buttress, but originally opening to a stair turret. The belfry windows are plain two-light openings, and the exterior of the church is very much overgrown with ivy. The font has a rough circular bowl with four pieces of leaf carving, apparently of late 12th-century date, and stands in the eastern tower arch. On the north of the chancel arch is a wall monument to Lady Elizabeth Duncombe undated, on the south another to William Duncombe, 1603, set up about 1640, and on the north wall of the nave a third to Sir John Duncombe, 1687.
There are three bells, the treble and the tenor blank and the second of 1813.
The plate consists of two communion cups of 1676, two standing patens of 1674, and a large paten given in 1696 by Elizabeth daughter of Nathaniel Reynes, vicar of the parish and of Friern Barnet.
The earliest register book contains all entries from 1694 to 1807, but the marriages only till 1753; the second book is of marriages 1754 to 1799, and the third has marriages 1799 to 1812 and baptisms and burials 1807 to 1812.

References

External links

 Battlesden pages at the Bedfordshire and Luton Archives and Record Service
 A Brief History of Battlesden

Villages in Bedfordshire
Civil parishes in Bedfordshire
Central Bedfordshire District